"Tiergarten" is a song written and performed by Canadian-American singer-songwriter Rufus Wainwright. Released in October 2007, it was the third single from Wainwright's fifth studio album, Release the Stars. A limited edition (500 copies) 12" vinyl single containing "Supermayer Lost in Tiergarten" was released on October 27. A one-track EP also containing the Supermayer remix was released in the UK through iTunes and 7digital on October 29. 

Both the album version and remix of "Tiergarten" failed to chart in any country despite the success of Release the Stars. The remix also appears on the eleventh installment of the Chillout Sessions compilation series.

Track listing

12" vinyl single
"Supermayer Lost in Tiergarten"

Tiergarten EP
"Supermayer Lost in Tiergarten"

Personnel

 Rufus Wainwright – vocals, piano, percussion
 Jason Boshoff – programming
 Marius de Vries – programming, breathing
 Jeff Hill – bass
 Matt Johnson – drums
 Gerry Leonard – electric guitar
 Ronith Mues – harp
 Jenni Muldaur – backing vocals
 Tom Stephan – additional programming
 Neil Tennant – backing vocals, breathing
 Richard Thompson – acoustic guitar
 Teddy Thompson – backing vocals

Other appearances
Chillout Sessions XI (2008, Ministry of Sound) – "Supermayer Lost in Tiergarten"

References

2007 singles
2007 songs
Geffen Records singles
Rufus Wainwright songs
Songs written by Rufus Wainwright
Song recordings produced by Rufus Wainwright